The 1972 Brantford municipal election was held on December 4, 1972, to elect a mayor, councillors, school trustees, and public utility commissioners in the city of Brantford, Ontario, Canada.

Charles Bowen was elected to his first term as mayor.

Results

John Robert (Jack) Arnold (died August 13, 2010) was born in Brantford, served in the Canadian Navy during his youth (including a stint in Halifax, Nova Scotia during World War II), and later returned to Brantford to become a businessman in the city. He also became a pilot in the 1960s, worked in aviation history, and restored several vintage planes. He died in 2010, at age eighty-three.

Note: Vincent Bucci's city council page indicates that he won the final seat following a recount.

Source: Brantford Expositor, 5 December 1972.

References

1972 elections in Canada
1972
1972 in Ontario
December 1972 events in Canada